The Silence of Dean Maitland is an 1886 novel by Maxwell Gray (the pen name of Mary Gleed Tuttiett). Set in a fictionalized Isle of Wight, particularly around Calbourne, it concerns an ambitious clergyman who accidentally kills the father of a young woman he has made pregnant, then allows his best friend to be wrongly convicted for the crime. A popular bestseller, it was filmed in 1914, in 1915 (under the title Sealed Lips), and in 1934.

References

External links
 The Silence of Dean Maitland, Internet Archive.
 The World's Greatest Books, Volume 5, Project Gutenberg, which leads with an extended synopsis by Maxwell Gray.
The Silence of Dean Matiland play at AustLit

1886 British novels
British novels adapted into films